The Château de Salignac is the former castle of the Salignac-Fénelon family in the commune of Salignac-Eyvigues  in the Dordogne département of France. It dates from the 12th-16th centuries.

It has been classified since 1969 as a monument historique by the French Ministry of Culture.

See also
List of castles in France

References

External links
 

Castles in Nouvelle-Aquitaine
Monuments historiques of Dordogne
Châteaux in Dordogne